Eastern Division or East Division may refer to:

Military 
 12th (Eastern) Division, was a division raised by the British Army during the First World War
 12th (Eastern) Infantry Division, was a division raised by the British Army during the Second World War
 18th (Eastern) Division, was a division raised by the British Army during the First World War

Places 
 Eastern Division, Fiji
 Eastern Division (New South Wales)
 Eastern Land Division, a cadastral division of Western Australia

Sports 
 East Division (AFL), a division of the Arena Football League
 East Division (CFL), a division of the Canadian Football League
 East Division (NHL), a division of the National Hockey League
 AFC East, a division of the American Football Conference
 American League East, a division of Major League Baseball
 National League East, a division of Major League Baseball
 NFC East, a division of the National Football Conference
 Eastern Division of the Southeastern Conference
 Eastern Division (cricket), a division of Minor League Cricket

Other uses
BMT Eastern Division of the New York City Subway
East Division High School, Milwaukee, Wisconsin, United States

See also 

 Eastern Conference (disambiguation)
 Central Division (disambiguation)
 Northern Division (disambiguation)
 Southern Division (disambiguation)
 Western Division (disambiguation)
 
 
 
 Division (disambiguation)
 Eastern (disambiguation)
 East (disambiguation)